This is a list of Albanian weightlifters.

Male weightlifters
 Ferid Berberi (born 1946)
 Briken Calja (born 1990)
 Erlin Nikolla (born 1963)
 Aleksandër Kondo (1960–1987)
 Daniel Godelli (born 1992)
 Agron Haxhihyseni (born 1971)
 Endri Haxhihyseni (born 1986)
 Endri Karina (born 1989)
 Leonidas Kokas (born 1973)
 Viktor Mitrou (born 1973)
 Ymer Pampuri (1944–2017)
 Hysen Pulaku (born 1992)
 Erkand Qerimaj (born 1988)
 Leonidas Sabanis (born 1971)
 Ilirian Suli (born 1975)
 Gert Trasha (born 1988)
 Theoharis Trasha (born 1985)
 Sokol Bishanaku (born 1971)
 Fatmir Bushi (born 1963)
 Dede Dekaj (born 1970)

Female weightlifters
 Romela Begaj (born 1986)
 Fetije Kasa (born 1985)
 Evagjelia Veli (born 1991)

References

Albanian weightlifters
Albania